The Julius A. Wayland House is a historic house in Girard, Kansas. It was built in 1886, and it belonged to socialist publisher Julius Wayland, who committed suicide in the house in 1912. It is listed on the National Register of Historic Places.

History
The house was built by Allen Bros. for John F. Moore in 1886, and it belonged to Sarah Flint from 1893 to 1896.

It was acquired by Etta Bevan Wayland in 1896. Her husband, Julius Wayland, was the publisher of Appeal to Reason, a socialist newspaper. He committed suicide in the house on November 11, 1912.

Architectural significance
The house was designed in the Stick/Eastlake architectural style. It has been listed on the National Register of Historic Places since November 21, 1976.

References

Houses on the National Register of Historic Places in Kansas
National Register of Historic Places in Crawford County, Kansas
Stick-Eastlake architecture in the United States
Houses completed in 1886